Vratja Vas (in older sources Vratje) is a village on the right bank of the Mura River in the Municipality of Apače in northeastern Slovenia, right on the border with Austria.

References

External links 
Vratja Vas on Geopedia

Populated places in the Municipality of Apače